Chris or Christopher Stewart may refer to:

Entertainment
Chris Stewart (author) (born 1950), former member (drummer) of British band Genesis
Christopher Stewart (artist) (born 1966), British visual artist and educator
Christopher S. Stewart, American author
Chris Stewart (1946 - 15 May 2020), Northern Irish bass player and session musician associated with Eire Apparent and Spooky Tooth
Chris Stewart, former lead guitarist for the rock band Black Veil Brides
Christopher Stewart, a.k.a. Tricky Stewart (born 1977), American rapper and music producer

Others
Chris Stewart (baseball) (born 1982), American MLB player
Chris Stewart (ice hockey, born 1961), Canadian ice hockey coach
Chris Stewart (ice hockey, born 1987), Canadian hockey player
Chris Stewart (politician) (born 1960), American author, businessman, politician, and former Air Force pilot
Chris Stewart (athletics), British marathoner, third place at the NYC marathon, 1976

See also
Kris Stewart (born 1967), English football club chairman
Chris Stuart (born 1948), British journalist